Vince Hill (born November 22, 1985) is an American football defensive back who is currently a free agent. He played college football at Miles College. He has been a member of the Alabama Vipers, Arizona Rattlers, San Jose SaberCats, Alabama Hammers, Alabama Outlawz and Florida Tarpons.

College career
Hill played college football for the Miles Golden Bears and earned All-Southern Intercollegiate Athletic Conference honors in 2008.

Professional career

Alabama Vipers
Hill signed with the Alabama Vipers on March 19, 2010. He earned Second Team All-Arena honors and led the AFL in pass breakups with 30 in 2010.

Arizona Rattlers
Hill was signed by the Arizona Rattlers on October 6, 2010.

San Jose SaberCats
Hill signed with the San Jose SaberCats on September 28, 2011.

Alabama Hammers
Hill played for the Alabama Hammers of the Professional Indoor Football League from 2013 to 2014, winning the PIFL championship in 2013.

Alabama Outlawz
Hill was signed by the Alabama Outlawz in December 2014.

Florida Tarpons
On May 8, 2016, Hill signed with the Florida Tarpons.

AFL statistics

Stats from ArenaFan:

References

External links
Just Sports Stats

Living people
1985 births
American football defensive backs
African-American players of American football
Miles Golden Bears football players
Alabama Vipers players
Arizona Rattlers players
Alabama Hammers players
San Jose SaberCats players
Florida Tarpons players
Players of American football from Atlanta
21st-century African-American sportspeople
20th-century African-American people